Malaysia competed at the 1964 Summer Olympics in Tokyo, Japan.  It was the first time that the Federation had competed under that name, as it was previously named Malaya, while North Borneo and Singapore had sent separate teams to the Games (Singapore became separate again later). 62 competitors, 58 men and 4 women, took part in 49 events in 10 sports.

Athletics

Men
Track events

Field event

Women
Track event

Boxing

Men

Cycling

Nine cyclists represented Malaysia in 1964.

Road

Track
Time trial

Pursuit

Fencing

One male fencer, represented Malaysia in 1964.

Men

Hockey

Men's tournament
Team roster

 Ho Koh Chye
 Kandiah Anandarajah
 Manikam Shanmuganathan
 Michael Arulraj
 Doraisamy Munusamy
 Lawrence van Huizen
 Douglas Nonis
 Chelliah Paramalingam
 Tara Singh Sindhu
 Koh Hock Seng
 Rajaratnam Yogeswaran
 Arumugam Sabapathy
 Ranjit Singh Gurdit
 Kunaratnam Alagaratnam
 Lim Fung Chong 

Group B

Ranked 9th in final standings

Judo

Men

Shooting

Seven shooters represented Malaysia in 1964.

Men

Swimming

Men

Women

Weightlifting

Men

Wrestling

Men
Freestyle

Notes

References

External links
 Official Olympic Reports

Nations at the 1964 Summer Olympics
1964
1964
1964 in Malaysian sport
Oly